Suzanne Giese (1946–2012) was a Danish writer and women's rights activist. She was one of the prominent members of the Danish Red Stocking Movement in the early 1970s. In 1973, together with her husband , she established the Tiderne Skifter publishing house which promoted literature on feminism and women's rights.

Suzanne Gieze died on 28 July 2012 after a short illness.

References

1946 births
2012 deaths
People from Copenhagen
20th-century Danish novelists
Danish feminists
Danish women's rights activists
20th-century Danish women writers